Latisternum simile is a species of beetle in the family Cerambycidae. It was described by Báguena and Breuning in 1958.

References

Ancylonotini
Beetles described in 1958